The PL-2 is an infrared homing (IRH) air-to-air missiles (AAM) developed in the People's Republic of China (PRC). It was a reverse-engineered Soviet Vympel K-13, which in turn was a reverse-engineered American AIM-9B Sidewinder.

The PL-2 was the root of a family of AAMs; of the derivatives, only the PL-5B was successful.

PL-2
The PRC acquired an intact AIM-9B during the Second Taiwan Strait Crisis in 1958. Air combat between over the strait between the Republic of China Air Force (ROCAF) and the People's Liberation Army Air Force (PLAAF) marked the combat debut of AAMs, with Sidewinder-armed ROCAF F-86 Sabres achieving notable success against PLAAF J-5s. On 28 September, a J-5 returned to base with an unexploded Sidewinder lodged in its airframe.

The PRC's attempts to reverse engineer the AIM-9B failed. The PRC transferred the missile to the Soviet Union, which agreed to share the reverse engineered product; in 1961, the PRC received technical data for and examples of the K-13. Replication of the K-13 began in 1962 with live-fire tests occurring in 1967. In 1967, Factory 331 in Zhuzhou was permitted to begin series production, but series production was delayed until 1970 due to the Cultural Revolution. In 1970, production transferred to the Nanfeng Machinery Plant in Hanzhong. Production of the PL-2A ended in February 1984.

The PL-2B was based on the AIM-9E. Development began in 1976 and it entered mass production in 1981; production ended in 1986.

PL-3
The PL-3 was the first indigenously developed AAM in China. Originally, the idea was to build an improved version of the Vympel K-13, with increased speed, range, precision, lethality and maneuverability.  The main contractor was the 612th Research Institute (later reorganized as the Luoyang Electro-Optics Technology Development Centre (EOTDC)).

However, after the program begun in June 1962, the original goal proved to be too technologically ambitious for the Chinese industry back then to achieve. Additionally, the Cultural Revolution started a few years later, and it greatly affected the progress of the PL-3 program. As a result, the PL-3 project had borrowed heavily from the earlier PL-2 and the program was protracted: after the first batch of 20 missiles was completed in June 1968, and the second batch of 30 in December 1969, the necessary tests were not completed until November 1974, four years after the start in 1970. The missile finally received its state certification in April 1980, and 50 production version missiles were completed by 1981. However, during training and evaluations, it was revealed that the PL-3 did not significantly outperform the PL-2. Furthermore, the experience gained from the PL-3 project could be reused in the PL-2 improvement efforts, so there was no need to have an additional separate AAM program when the requirement could be met by just one.  Consequently, the PL-3 project was terminated in 1983.
Specifications:
Maximum range: 11.5 km
Minimum range: 1.3 km
Maximum speed: Mach 2.5
Maximum altitude: 23 km
Weight: 93 kg
Length: 2.123 m
Diameter: 135 mm
Wingspan: 654 mm

PL-5

The PL-5 is a further Chinese development of the PL-2. Earlier PL-series missiles had been developed from the Soviet Vympel K-13, and all of them were infrared-guided. The PL-5 AAM was the first Chinese attempt to follow the Soviet practice of developing both semi-active radar and infrared guidance for the same missile, and the main contractor was the 612th Research Institute (later reorganized as Luoyang Electro-Optics Technology Development Centre (EOTDC)).

Work on the SARH version of the PL-5 begun in April 1966, and first test flight was conducted in July 1971. Live round test fires begun in September 1972, but due to the Cultural Revolution that had seriously disrupted and delayed production and development, all of the missiles of the first batch of production ran out before the test could be completed. It was not until April 1984, well after the end of the Cultural Revolution, that the second batch was completed. Tests were resumed in August 1984, finally completed in March 1982. However, tests and evaluation revealed that the SARH version was not adequate enough and this version was consequently cancelled in 1983.

The infrared-guided version of PL-5 was equally affected by the political turmoil in China, and its development was delayed even further: it was not until September 1986 that this version finally received its state certification; the missile entered mass production in the same year. Despite the delay, this version proved to be more successful and many further upgrades were developed later on, including the PL-5E variant.

Specifications:
Maximum range: 10 km (PL-5A) / 16 km (PL-5B)
Minimum range: 1.3 km
Maximum speed: Mach 2.5
Maximum altitude: 18 km (PL-5A) / 21.5 km (PL-5B)
Minimum altitude: 1 km (PL-5A) / 0.5 km (PL-5B)
Maximum g: 30 g
Guidance: semi-active radar homing / infrared
Warhead: 30 kg
Weight: 150 kg (PL-5A) / 148 kg (PL-5B)
Length: 3.235 m (PL-5A) / 3.128 m (PL-5B)
Diameter: 190 mm
Wingspan: 657mm

PL-6
Due to the delays in its development, the PL-3 AAM was already inadequate before its completion. A follow-up was planned to incorporate advances in microelectronics and lessons learned in aerial combats, based on the feedback of Vietnam War. The reasons for starting development a new AAM were the inherent design limitations of the PL-3. During the development period of the latter missile, it was difficult to incorporate the technological advances as planned. The new program was designated as PL-6 and begun in 1975, before the PL-3 program was even completed. The main contractor was the 612th Research Institute (later reorganized as Luoyang Electro-Optics Technology Development Centre (EOTDC)).

The first batch of missiles was completed in 1978 and tests were successfully completed in 1979. However, the PL-6 met the same fate as its predecessor, the PL-3: during training and evaluations, it was revealed that the PL-6 did not significantly outperform the PL-3. Furthermore, the experience gained from the PL-6 project could be reused in the PL-2 improvement efforts, so there was no need to have an additional, separate AAM program, when the requirement could be met by just one. Consequently, the PL-6 program was drastically scaled back in 1981, and after a very limited production run, the PL-6 was terminated in 1983.
Maximum range: 11.5 km
Minimum range: 1.3 m
Maximum speed: Mach 2.5
Maximum altitude: 23 km
Maximum g force: 29 g
Weight: 93 kg
Length: 2.123 m
Diameter: 135 mm
Wingspan: 654 mm

Operators

Bangladesh Air Force

Myanmar Air Force

 People's Liberation Army
People's Liberation Army Air Force
People's Liberation Army Navy Air Force

 Air Force of Zimbabwe - replaced by the PL-5

References

Citations

Bibliography

Guided missiles of the People's Republic of China
Air-to-air missiles of the People's Republic of China
Cold War weapons of China
China–Soviet Union relations
Military equipment introduced in the 1970s